In 2009 the Gulf Volleyball Clubs Champions Championship was won by the Al-Ahli Saudi Football Club team.

League standings

Source: kooora.com (Arabic)

References

GCC Volleyball Club Championship